Baron Victor de Tornaco (5 July 1805 – 28 September 1875) was a Luxembourg politician.  An Orangist, he was the fourth Prime Minister of Luxembourg, serving for seven years, from 26 September 1860 until 3 December 1867.

Family 
His parents were Charles Auguste de Tornaco and Elisabeth de Berlo-Suys (1775-1856).

He studied in Paris at the Ecole polytechnique. In the years after the Belgian Revolution of 1830 he supported William I, King of the Netherlands and Grand-Duke of Luxembourg. From 1841 to 1848 he was a member of the Assembly of Estates.

He was elected to represent the canton of Esch-sur-Alzette on the Constituent Assembly, in 1848. From 1848 to 1856 he was a member of the Chamber of Deputies, and from 1857 to 1860 of the re-established Assembly of Estates.

After the resignation of Charles-Mathias Simons, on 26 September 1860 he was appointed prime minister and Director-General (Minister) for Foreign Affairs and until 1864 also for public transport. On 11 May 1867 he and Emmanuel Servais signed the Second Treaty of London, which had far-reaching consequences for Luxembourg.

On 3 December 1867 the De Tornaco government lost a parliament vote. They had been accused by the opposition of taking a too passive role at the negotiations in London. He was succeeded by Emmanuel Servais. De Tornaco was from 3 December 1867 to 20 June 1872 a member of the council of state.

Victor Tornaco lived in Sanem Castle, which his family owned from 1753 to 1950. He died on 28 September 1875 at the castle of Voordt in the Belgian province of Limburg; he was buried in the family tomb in Sanem.

Honours 
before 1866.
  :  Minister of State. 
  :  Knight Grand Cross in the Order of the Oak Crown.
  :  Grand Cordon in the Order of Leopold.
  : Knight of the Order of the Crown of Prussia.
 Knight in the Order of the Netherlands Lion.
  : Commander in the Legion of Honour.

See also

Tornaco Ministry

References

|-

|-

|-

|-

Barons of Luxembourg
Prime Ministers of Luxembourg
Ministers for Foreign Affairs of Luxembourg
Ministers for Public Works of Luxembourg
Presidents of the Chamber of Deputies (Luxembourg)
Members of the Constituent Assembly of Luxembourg
Members of the Chamber of Deputies of Luxembourg from Esch-sur-Alzette
Members of the Council of State of Luxembourg
Luxembourgian Orangists
Luxembourgian nobility
1805 births
1875 deaths
19th-century Luxembourgian people